Mahmoud Daoud Sulaiman Al-Samra, محمود السمرة, (April 20, 1923 – November 10, 2018) was a Jordanian academic, academic administrator, and writer. Al-Samra served as the Jordanian Minister of Culture from 1991 until 1993. He authored more than 250 books, articles, research papers and other academic and literary works during his career.

Al-Samra was born in Tantura, Mandatory Palestine, in 1923.  He received his Bachelor of Arts from King Fuad University (present-day Cairo University) in 1950 and his doctorate in philosophy from the Institute of Oriental and African Studies at the University of London in 1958.

He served as the dean of the Faculty of Arts at the University of Jordan from 1968 to 1973 and Vice President of the University of Jordan from 1973 to 1989.

Mahmoud Al-Samra died on November 10, 2018, at the age of 95.

References

1923 births
2018 deaths
Culture ministers of Jordan
Academic staff of the University of Jordan
Alumni of SOAS University of London
Academic staff of Cairo University
Arab people in Mandatory Palestine
Mandatory Palestine expatriates in Egypt
Jordanian expatriates in the United Kingdom